There have been two baronetcies created for persons with the surname Stephen, both in the Baronetage of the United Kingdom. Both creations are extinct.

The Stephen baronetcy, of Montreal in the Province of Quebec in the Dominion of Canada, was created in the Baronetage of the United Kingdom on 3 March 1886 for George Stephen, a prominent Canadian businessman who was born in Scotland. In 1891, he was granted the title of Baron Mount Stephen in the Peerage of the United Kingdom. His titles became extinct upon his death in 1921.

The Stephen baronetcy, of De Vere Gardens in the parish of Saint Mary Abbott, Kensington, in the County of London, was created in the Baronetage of the United Kingdom on 29 June 1891 for Sir James Stephen, a judge of the High Court of Justice. The title became extinct on the death of the fourth Baronet in 1987.

Stephen baronets, of Montreal (1886)
Sir George Stephen, 1st Baronet (1829–1921), created Baron Mount Stephen in 1891

Stephen baronets, of De Vere Gardens (1891)
Sir James Fitzjames Stephen, 1st Baronet (1829–1894)
Sir Herbert Stephen, 2nd Baronet (1857–1932)
Sir Harry Lushington Stephen, 3rd Baronet (1860–1945)
Sir James Alexander Stephen, 4th Baronet (1908–1987)

Arms

References

 

Extinct baronetcies in the Baronetage of the United Kingdom